A flood occurred at the east coast of Peninsula Malaysia at the end of February 2022. The floods were caused by continuous heavy rains for several days since February 25 in most states of the Peninsula, especially in the states of Kelantan and Terengganu, which led to the significant floods in both states. Following the floods, several thousand people had to be evacuated, and the floods also affected neighboring regions of Thailand. These floods are considered unexpected due to flood times that are not in line with the usual annual weather patterns.

See also 
 Weather of 2022
 2021–2022 Malaysian floods

References 

Floods in Malaysia
2022 floods in Asia
February 2022 events in Asia
2022 disasters in Malaysia